is a Ryukyuan and Japanese name referring to certain venomous snakes:

 The following species are found in the Ryukyu Islands of Japan:
 Protobothrops elegans, a.k.a. the Sakishima habu, found in the southern Ryukyu Islands
 Protobothrops flavoviridis, a.k.a. the Okinawan habu, found in the southern Ryukyu Islands
 Protobothrops tokarensis, a.k.a. the Tokara habu, found in the Tokara Islands
 Ovophis okinavensis, a.k.a. the Hime habu
 Habu is a name also used for several other species:
 Trimeresurus gracilis, a.k.a. the Kikushi habu, found in Taiwan.
 Protobothrops mucrosquamatus, a.k.a. the Taiwan habu or Chinese habu, found in Southeast Asia.
 Ovophis monticola, a.k.a. the Arisan habu, found in Southeast Asia.
 Habu is a nickname given to the Lockheed SR-71 Blackbird strategic reconnaissance aircraft of the United States Air Force.